Johan Fredrik Åbom (30 July 1817 - April 20, 1900) was a Swedish architect.

Biography 

Åbom  was born in the parish of Katarina  in Stockholm County, Sweden. He was a student at the Royal Swedish Academy of Fine Arts in Stockholm at the same time as Fredrik Wilhelm Scholander
(1816–1881). Prior to this, he was a bricklayer apprentice and student at the KTH Royal Institute of Technology in Stockholm. Apart from a short study tour to Germany in 1852, he followed the traditional timeline for scientific publication.

After the Royal Art Academy and until 1882, he was working at the Swedish government administration of state buildings (Överintendentsämbetet).
During the years 1843–1853, he was working as an architect for prison management. He had the entire country as sphere of activity, with both public - and private assignments. He designed manor houses, banks, hotels, factories, hospitals, town halls, churches and theatres. In 1848  he was one of the founders of the Stockholm  building association (Stockholms byggnadsförening).  The association was established  for the exchange of information  and establishment of personal contacts within the trade trades.

Among the many restaurant and theatre buildings he designed were Södra Teatern built at Mosebacke square in Södermalm  during 1852 
and Berns salonger, a musical cabaret restaurant built in Stockholm during 1862 for restaurateur Heinrich Robert Berns (1815-1902).

Johan Fredrik Åbom also designed Boo Castle (Boo slott), a manor house constructed 1878–1882 in Gothic Revival on an estate at Lilla Nygatan in Gamla Stan in Stockholm.

Selected works
Ausås Kyrka
Fjällskäfte slott
Gamla riksdagshuset 
Hälleforsnäs Bruk
Kesätter slott
Linköpings stadshus
Fastigheten Midas 7, Mälartorget 13, Gamla stan
Södra teatern
Stockholms Enskilda Bank i Gamla stan
Hotel Rydberg
Residenset i Jönköping
Residenset i Karlstad
Stigbergets sjukhus vid Fjällgatan i Stockholm
Stora Sällskapet
Tanto sockerbruk
Gröna gården
Stockholms Nation, Uppsala, 1848
Katarina västra skola 1856
Maria folkskola, 1864
Lösens kyrka,1858–60
Kristine kyrka, Falun, 1864
Bankeryds kyrka, 1865
Utsiktstornet på Jacobsberg, 1865–67
Gymnastikbyggnaden i Jönköping, 1878–81
Västerviks läroverk (Ellen Key-skolan)
Fänneslunda-Grovare kyrka, 1874

Image Gallery

References

External links
 

1817 births
1900 deaths
Members of the Royal Swedish Academy of Arts
19th-century Swedish architects
Burials at Norra begravningsplatsen